Owen Liam Nolan (born 12 February 1972) is a Northern Irish-born, Canadian former professional ice hockey player. He was drafted first overall by the Quebec Nordiques in the 1990 NHL Entry Draft. During his 18-year NHL career, he played for the Nordiques, Colorado Avalanche, San Jose Sharks, Toronto Maple Leafs, Phoenix Coyotes, Calgary Flames, Minnesota Wild, as well as playing a season with the ZSC Lions of National League A. Born in Belfast, he was raised in Thorold, Ontario and played for Canada internationally. A five-time NHL All-Star, Nolan is widely known as a power forward.

Playing career

Minor Hockey
Nolan grew up in Thorold, Ontario playing minor hockey for Thorold  in the OMHA. After playing A hockey for the Thorold bantam A's Nolan was selected in the second round of the 1988 OHL Priority Selection by the Cornwall Royals.

Quebec Nordiques – San Jose Sharks
Nolan was drafted first overall by the Quebec Nordiques in the 1990 NHL Entry Draft. He was part of the franchise's transfer to Denver where the Nordiques were rebranded as the Colorado Avalanche.He began the 1995–96 season with four goals and four assists in nine games for the Avalanche before being traded to the Sharks for Sandis Ozoliņš on October 26, 1995. During his tenure with the Sharks he was named captain, and registered his best career year in 1999–2000, finishing with 84 points, and tied for second in the NHL with 44 goals. That same year, the eighth seeded Sharks took out the first-seeded Blues in seven games with Nolan leading the way with six goals. In game seven, Nolan scored with 10 seconds left in the first period from just past centre ice, beating goaltender Roman Turek to give the Sharks a 2–0 lead. The goal propelled them to a 3–1, game seven victory and first round upset of the Blues.

Toronto Maple Leafs
Nolan was traded to the Toronto Maple Leafs just before the NHL trade deadline in 2003, for players Alyn McCauley and Brad Boyes, and Toronto's first-round pick in the 2003 NHL Entry Draft. However his performance in Toronto was disappointing, he suffered from a series of injuries and never played at the same level as he had in San Jose.

Nolan broke new ground in contract negotiations, having a clause put in that stated if the 2004–05 NHL season was cancelled, then he would gain a player option for an additional year in 2005–06. However, with the NHL CBA in place, this option became a topic of debate. With the new NHL salary cap, the Maple Leafs deemed Nolan's salary too high, and refuse to recognize Nolan as under contract. Nolan argued that the option was valid, that he would play, and be paid, for the Toronto Maple Leafs, and that he deserved to be paid during the 2004–05 NHL lockout due to injury. The Maple Leafs, who deemed Nolan as healthy just after the lock-out, claimed that the injury was incurred off the ice and refused to pay Nolan's desired US$12 million. The case went to an arbitrator. This case was settled in late 2006, however, the terms of the agreement by Leafs management and Nolan were not disclosed. In 2005–2006, Nolan took time off for his injured knees to heal, training in San Jose at Sharks Ice. Before the playoff push, Nolan indicated that several teams (including San Jose) wanted to sign him, but he decided not to play because he wanted to be at 100%, both because he did not want to become re-injured and because he felt he owed his team that.

2006–2011
In the summer of 2006, during free agency, Nolan contemplated joining many teams before signing a one-year, US$1 million contract with the Phoenix Coyotes. He scored 16 goals to go with 24 assists during his only year in Phoenix before becoming a free agent once again. On 2 July 2007, Nolan signed with the Calgary Flames. On 22 October 2007, Nolan played his 1000th game.

On 30 January 2008, Nolan had his 11th career hat trick and first hat trick since 1999 in a 5–4 victory over former team the San Jose Sharks. He was honoured as the game's first star as his hat trick included a short-handed goal and the game winner, and Nolan also had a decisive victory in a second-period fight with Mike Grier. On 13 April 2008, Nolan scored the game-winning goal in game three of the first round of the 2008 NHL Playoffs against his former team San Jose Sharks. It was his first playoff goal since 2002, when he was a member of the Sharks and the 19th playoff goal of his 18-year career.

On 6 July 2008, Nolan signed a two-year, $5.5 million contract with the Minnesota Wild. On 10 March 2009, Nolan scored his 400th (and 401st) goal of his NHL career with the Minnesota Wild against the San Jose Sharks.

A free agent prior to the 2010–11 season, and with the intention of continuing his NHL career, Nolan was unable to secure an NHL contract. With the beginning of the season underway, in order to garner interest and keep in game condition, Nolan signed a one-month contract with Swiss team, ZSC Lions of the National League A, on 20 October 2010. On 4 August 2011, Nolan signed a tryout contract with the Vancouver Canucks, returning to the NHL after a year in Switzerland. He was then released by the Vancouver Canucks on 25 September 2011, admittedly due to issues with his family.

Retirement
On 7 February 2012, Nolan announced his retirement from professional hockey, at a press conference in San Jose five days before his 40th birthday. He was then immediately chosen for a ceremonial puck drop in a game against the Calgary Flames.

All-Star appearances
Nolan has been chosen as an NHL all-star in 1991–92, 1995–96, 1996–97, 1999–2000, 2001–02.  He was the runner-up to Mark Recchi for the All-Star game MVP in 1997, during which he performed a memorable 'called shot', pointing to the top corner of the net on a breakaway and promptly scoring there against Dominik Hašek to complete a hat trick.

Personal life
Nolan is one of six players in NHL history to be born on the island of Ireland (Sid Finney, Bobby Kirk, Jim McFadden, Sammy McManus and Jack Riley are the others).  He moved to Thorold, Ontario when he was seven months old and grew up playing baseball and football (soccer); it was not until he was nine that he began skating.  He attended Denis Morris Catholic High School in St. Catharines, Ontario.

Nolan owns two restaurants called Britannia Arms in San Jose, California. He and his wife Diana have one daughter, Jordan, and one son, Dylan.

Career statistics

Regular season and playoffs

International

Awards and honours

Other
 Bay Area Sports Hall of Fame inductee (2014)

See also
 List of NHL players with 1,000 games played
 List of National Hockey League players born in the United Kingdom

References

External links
 
 
 
 

1972 births
Calgary Flames players
Canadian expatriate ice hockey players in Switzerland
Canadian ice hockey right wingers
Canadian people of Northern Ireland descent
Colorado Avalanche players
Cornwall Royals (OHL) players
Halifax Citadels players
Ice hockey players at the 2002 Winter Olympics
Ice hockey right wingers from Northern Ireland
Living people
Medalists at the 2002 Winter Olympics
Minnesota Wild players
National Hockey League All-Stars
National Hockey League first-overall draft picks
National Hockey League first-round draft picks
Naturalized citizens of Canada
Northern Ireland emigrants to Canada
Olympic gold medalists for Canada
Olympic ice hockey players of Canada
Olympic medalists in ice hockey
People from Thorold
Phoenix Coyotes players
Quebec Nordiques draft picks
Quebec Nordiques players
San Jose Sharks players
Sportspeople from Belfast
Toronto Maple Leafs players
ZSC Lions players